Nassim Maalouf (born 1941 in Kafarakab, Lebanon) is a classical trumpet soloist particularly known for his adaptation of the trumpet to Arabic music with the introduction of quarter tones on the instrument.

Family
Maalouf's brother is French-Lebanese writer Amin Maalouf; their mother is Egyptian of Turkish origin and their father is a Greek Catholic.

Maalouf's son, Ibrahim Maalouf, is a jazz trumpeter and composer.

Career 

Maalouf studied at the Conservatoire de Paris with the great French trumpeter Maurice André, graduating in 1970.

While he had by that time mastered the European classical trumpet repertoire he had for some time felt restricted by being able to play only in the major and minor scales.  Although he wished to interpret the numerous Arabic modes (known as maqamat, singular maqam) on his instrument, he nevertheless found this quite difficult, as the necessary "half-sharps" and "half-flats" could only be obtained via the unreliable method of modulating lip pressure.

Finally, Maalouf realized that adding to his trumpet a fourth valve half the length of the second valve would allow for the production of quarter tones.  Maalouf worked for two years with the craftsman Michel Wikrikaz of the Henri Selmer company in Paris to produce his design of a "quarter-tone" trumpet and flugelhorn, both suitable for performing Arabic maqamat throughout the full chromatic range of the instrument.

Maalouf uses his right hand to play the first three valves and the index finger of his left hand to depress the fourth valve.  Maalouf's quarter-tone trumpet was not the first such instrument, however; the American jazz trumpeter Don Ellis and others had earlier created similar instruments.

In addition to his career as trumpet soloist, Maalouf has also taught at the National Conservatory in Beirut.  Maalouf's son, Ibrahim Maalouf (b. 1980), is also a classically trained trumpeter and plays the quarter-tone trumpet.

Maalouf has released a solo CD, Improvisations Orientales (1994), on the Club Du Disque Arabe label.

References

External links
Official website
 Nassim Maalouf page from Le Quatuor de Cuivres ARIA site

1941 births
Living people
Lebanese classical trumpeters
Lebanese people of Greek descent 
Lebanese people of Turkish descent
Conservatoire de Paris alumni
21st-century trumpeters